The 2009 Qatar Speedcar Series round was the threth round of the 2008–09 Speedcar Series. It was held on 13 and 14 February 2009 at Losail International Circuit in Lusail, Qatar. The race supported the 2009 Qatar GP2 Asia Series round.

Classification

Qualifying

Race 1

Race 2

See also 
 2009 Qatar GP2 Asia Series round

References

Speedcar Series
Speedcar
Speedcar